Benjamin A. "Mose" Goodman (born c. 1895) was an American football coach.  He was the 14th head football coach at the Virginia Military Institute in Lexington, Virginia, serving for the 1918 season and compelling a record of 1–3. He later worked as a grocer in Pensacola, Florida.

References

Year of birth uncertain
1890s births
Year of death missing
American football ends
American grocers
VMI Keydets football coaches
VMI Keydets football players
Sportspeople from Norfolk, Virginia
Players of American football from Norfolk, Virginia